The Lady Banker (1980) (original French title ), is a French drama film directed by Francis Girod, written by Georges Conchon and Francis Girod, starring Romy Schneider, Jean-Louis Trintignant, Marie-France Pisier, Claude Brasseur, Jean-Claude Brialy, Daniel Auteuil and Thierry Lhermitte; the music is by Ennio Morricone.

Cast
 Romy Schneider as Emma Eckhert
 Marie-France Pisier as Colette Lecoudray
 Claude Brasseur as Largué
 Jean-Claude Brialy as Paul Cisterne
 Jean Carmet as Duvernet
 Jean-Louis Trintignant as Horace Vannister
 Jacques Fabbri as Moïse Nathanson
 Daniel Mesguich as Rémy Lecoudray
 Noëlle Chatelet as Camille Sowcroft
 Daniel Auteuil as Duclaux
 Thierry Lhermitte as Devoluy
 Alan Adair as Sir Charles
 François-Régis Bastide as Le ministre de la Justice
 Arnaud Boisseau as Armand
 Yves Brainville as Prefaille

Notes
The film was entered in four categories at the 6th César Awards in 1981 but lost them all to The Last Metro.

The story was inspired by the French woman banker Marthe Hanau.

References

External links

1980 films
1980 LGBT-related films
French drama films
French LGBT-related films
LGBT-related films based on actual events
Films directed by Francis Girod
Films set in the 1920s
Lesbian-related films
Police detective films
Trading films
LGBT-related drama films
1980 drama films
Films à clef
1980s French films